Apostolos "Lakis" Glezos (Greek: Απόστολος "Λάκης" Γκλέζος; 4 February 1947 – 18 June 2007) was a Greek football defender.

Career
Born in Piraeus, Glezos began playing football as a defender for the youth sides of Atromitaki and Ermis Nikaia. In 1963, he joined Proodeftiki F.C., where he would play for nine seasons. Glezos helped Proodeftiki achieve a fourth-place finish in the Alpha Ethniki during the 1964–65 season. Alpha Ethniki side Iraklis Thessaloniki F.C. signed Papaioannou in 1979, and would play for Iraklis until city rivals PAOK F.C. signed him in 1986.

In 1972, Glezos joined Olympiacos F.C. where he played until 1978, winning three Alpha Ethniki and two Greek Football Cup titles. He finished his career with Kallithea F.C., suffering a serious knee injury in 1979. All told, Glezos made over 260 appearances in the Greek first and second divisions.

Glezos made 10 appearances and scored one goal for the Greece national football team from 1971 to 1974. He made his debut as a second-half substitute in a 1–0 UEFA Euro 1972 qualifying defeat to Switzerland on 12 May 1971.

Personal life
Glezos died after a long battle with cancer at age 60.

References

External links

1947 births
2007 deaths
Greece international footballers
Proodeftiki F.C. players
Olympiacos F.C. players
Kallithea F.C. players
Super League Greece players
Association football defenders
Footballers from Piraeus
Greek footballers